Verbitsky (Verbitskii) is a Russian language surname. It corresponds to the Polish surname Wierzbicki.

People with the surname include:

Andrey Alexandrovich Verbitsky (born 1941), Russian scientist
Bernardo Verbitsky (1907–1979), Argentine writer and journalist
Horacio Verbitsky (born 1942), Argentine writer and journalist
Misha Verbitsky (born 1969), Russian mathematician and activist
Vladimir Verbitsky (born 1943), Russian/Australian conductor
Garry Verbitsky (born 1967) Russian actor

Russian-language surnames